Trigonopterum is a genus of flowering plants belonging to the family Asteraceae. It contains a single species, Trigonopterum laricifolium. Its native range is the Galapagos Islands in Ecuador.

References

Heliantheae
Monotypic Asteraceae genera